The 2021 USL League One season was the third season of USL League One. The regular season began on April 10 and ended on October 30, 2021. The playoffs was held from November 6 to 20, 2021.

North Carolina FC joined the league for this season, after leaving the USL Championship in what the team called a "strategic move" to enhance its youth development pathway.

Greenville Triumph SC were the defending champions on both regular season and playoffs. Union Omaha took both titles to won their first League One regular season and championship titles.

Teams

Managerial changes

League table

Results table

Playoffs
The 2021 USL League One Playoffs (branded as the 2021 USL League One Playoffs presented by TwinSpires for sponsorship reasons) was the post-season championship of the USL League One season.

Bracket

Schedule

Quarter-finals

Semi-finals

Final

Championship Game MVP: Damià Viader (Union Omaha)

Regular season statistical leaders

Top scorers

Hat-tricks

Notes
(H) – Home team(A) – Away team

Top assists

Clean sheets

Individual awards

All-league teams

Monthly awards

Weekly awards

See also
 USL League One
 2021 USL Championship season
 2021 USL League Two season

References

External links
 USL League One official website

 
2020
2021 in American soccer leagues
Association football events postponed due to the COVID-19 pandemic